Marion Campbell is a former American football player.

Marion Campbell may also refer to:

Marion Campbell (archaeologist), Scottish amateur archaeologist
Marion May Campbell, Australian writer
Dorothy Marion Campbell, English potter known as Marion Campbell